Demetrios Iatropoulos was a senior Byzantine official of the late 13th century. He served as logothetes ton oikeiakon from 1260 until 1295, when he was promoted to protasekretis. He took part in the 1273 synod in Constantinople against patriarch John XI Bekkos, and is mentioned in 1281/2 as leading an embassy to the Empire of Trebizond.

Sources 
 

13th-century births
13th-century Byzantine people
Byzantine officials
Byzantine diplomats
Year of death unknown
13th-century diplomats
Byzantine Empire–Empire of Trebizond relations